Massachusett is an indigenous Algonquian language of the Algic language family.  It was the primary language of several peoples of New England, including the Massachusett in the area roughly corresponding to Boston, Massachusetts, including much of the Metrowest and South Shore areas just to the west and south of the city; the Wampanoag, who still inhabit Cape Cod and the Islands, most of Plymouth and Bristol counties and south-eastern Rhode Island, including some of the small islands in Narragansett Bay; the Nauset, who may have rather been an isolated Wampanoag sub-group, inhabited the extreme ends of Cape Cod; the Coweset of northern Rhode Island; and the Pawtucket which covered most of north-eastern Massachusetts and the lower tributaries of the Merrimack River and coast of New Hampshire, and the extreme southernmost point of Maine. Massachusett was also used as a common second language of peoples throughout New England and Long Island, particularly in a simplified pidgin form.

The missionary John Eliot learned the language from bilingual translators and interpreters. In writing down the language, he used the Latin alphabet and English-style orthographical conventions. By the 1650s, Eliot had begun translating portions of the Bible, some published, that were distributed to the Indians, and the Indians that learned to read became active agents in the spread of literacy. Eliot used the dialect of the Massachusett, specifically the speech of Natick, in his Bible translation—the first Bible in any language printed in the Americas—and other printed works; dialect leveling ensued. Several other missionaries fluent in the language also offered their own missionary tracts and translations. By the 1670s, only twenty years after Eliot's first translations, one in three Indians were literate. The language faded as Indians faced increasing dispossession and assimilation pressures, with the last speakers dying off at the tail end of the nineteenth century.

In 1993, Jessie Little Doe Baird (née Fermino), co-founded the Wôpanâak Language Reclamation Project in an effort to bring the language back to her people. She studied at the Massachusetts Institute of Technology with linguists Kenneth Hale and later Norvin Richards. In her master's thesis, completed in 2000, Baird introduced a modernized orthography, one that while still based in Latin and inspired by the colonial system,  represented a one-to-one correlation between sound and spelling.

Pre-writing

Prior to the introduction of literacy by the missionary Eliot, the Massachusett-speaking peoples were mainly an orally transmitted culture, with social taboos, mores, customs, legends, history, knowledge and traditions passed from the elders to the next generation through song, stories and discussion.  With peoples from further away, speakers switched to a pidgin variety of Massachusett used across New England, but when spoken language failed, sign language was used.  Little is known about the Eastern Woodlands Algonquian sign language other than its usage. Lenape were often recruited in the wars with the Indians of the west because of their ability to effectively communicate in silence. Even American Sign Language was likely influenced by the sign language of the Wampanoag of Martha's Vineyard, who interacted with a large population of English colonists who were deaf and signed.  Martha's Vineyard Sign Language went extinct at the beginning of the twentieth century, but many of its users were influential in the development of ASL. Little is known of it other than its existence, but it was likely similar in scope and usage such as extant Plains Indian Sign Language.

 The most important form of symbolic communication that the Indians employed were dendroglyphs. These symbols carved into trees and logs served as boundary markers between tribes, to thank local spirits in the wake of a successful hunt and to record one's whereabouts.  Moravian missionaries in the mid-eighteenth century noted that the Lenape of Pennsylvania and New Jersey would carve animals and etchings onto trees when they camped, and were able to pinpoint the tribe, region or village of symbols that they encountered. Similarly, the Abenaki peoples of northern New England used etchings on trees to mark paths or drew beaver huts and ponds to mark their trapping areas. The Mi'kmaq pictographic tradition was later converted into a true writing system with adjustments by French missionaries. These symbols were also painted. In 1813, residents found a tree carved into the shape of a woman and a child around Lake Winnipesaukee. Evidence for dendroglyphic picture writing in southern New England is lacking, as most of the trees were felled by the Federal Period, with current forests consisting of secondary growth after farms were abandoned for land in the Great Plains in the end of the nineteenth century. The markings may have been similar to the wiigwaasabak of Anishinaabe (Ojibwe) culture in scope and usage, able to record mnemonically songs related to ritual traditions, meetings between clans, maps and tribal identity.

Pictographs carved into the rocks date back to the middle Archaic Period, ca. 6000-4000 BC up until a century after colonization.  Most notorious are the etchings on Dighton Rock in the Taunton River but also several sites around Assawompset Pond.  The figures depicted on Dighton Rock are similar to those of Bellows Falls, Vermont and other sites across New England.  Most depictions include carved hands, the sun, the moon in various phases, people or spirits, anthropomorphic beings, various native animals, markings similar to the letters 'E,' 'M,' 'X,' and 'I,' slashes and crosses, circles that may represent planetary figures, trees, river courses and figures from shamanic tradition like giants, thunderbirds and horned serpents.  During and after colonization, some depict Europeans and ships.  Many are carved near water, and probably because these were sacred sites, commemorated historic agreements or to mark the land.

Early adopters of literacy are known to have signed their names with animal symbols related to their tribe, clan or stature.  For a century after English arrival, the Indians continued to mark rocks and trees, and one site in Massachusetts features a large boulder, with depictions of wetus from as far back as 3000 years old, to depictions of ships shortly after the period of English settlement began, and a few drawings and the Latin letters of the owner's name, where a Wampanoag family was present until the early twentieth century.  As late as the 1920s, Nipmuc women in central Massachusetts, a people closely connected culturally and linguistically with the Massachusett-speaking peoples, still made traditional baskets that were often decorated with woven or painted symbols representing the local landscape, such as the use of domed figures for homes (wetus), dots for people, parallel and diagonal lines to represent plots of land and other symbols whose meaning are lost.  It is unknown whether or not the basketry traditions represent a continuation or have any connection to the earlier petro- and dendroglyph traditions.

Alphabet

References

Notes

Bibliography
Baird, J. L. D. "Fun With Words". Wôpanâak Language Reclamation Project, 2014.
Costa, David J. "The dialectology of Southern New England Algonquian." In 38th Algonquian Conference, 81-127. 2007.
Eliot, John. Indian Grammar Begun. Cambridge, MA: Marmaduke Robinson, 1666.
Eliot, John, trans. Mamvsse Wunneetupanatamwe Up-Biblum God (The Holy Bible containing the Old Testament and the New), rev. ed., 1685.
Fermino, Jessie Little Doe. "An Introduction to Wampanoag Grammar." Master's Thesis, Massachusetts Institute of Technology, 2000.
Goddard, Ives. "Eastern Algonquian as a genetic subgrouping." Algonquian Papers-Archive 11 (1980).
Goddard, Ives. "Unhistorical features of Nassachusett." Edited by J. Fisiak, Historical Linguistics and Philology: Trends in Linguistics. Studies and Monographs (TILSM), vol. 46, 228–233. Berlin, Germany: Walter de Gruyter, 1990.
Goddard, Ives. "Introduction." In Ives Goddard, ed., The Handbook of North American Indians, Volume 17. Languages, 1–16. 1996.
Hewson, John. "Proto-Algonquian Roots." 2014. Compiled from data generated in the publication of Hewson's A Computer-Generated Dictionary of Proto-Algonquian. Canadian Ethnology Service: Mercury Series Paper 125. Ottawa, ON: Canadian Museum of Civilization, 1993. 
Hicks, Nitana. "A List of Initials and Finals in Wôpanâak." Master's thesis, Massachusetts Institute of Technology, 2006.
Hoffman, W. J. "The Mide'wiwin or "Grand Medicine Society" of the Ojibwa." In Seventh Annual Report of the Bureau of Ethnology to the Secretary of the Smithsonian Institution, 1885-1886, 286–89. Washington, D. C.: Government Printing Office, 1891. 
Lenik, E. J. Making Pictures in Stone: American Indian Rock Art of the Northeast. Tuscaloosa: University of Alabama Press, 2009.
Nash, J. C. P. "Martha's Vineyard Sign Language." In Julie Bakken Jepsen, Goedele De Clerck, Sam Lutalo-Kiingi, and William B. McGregor, eds., Sign Languages of the World: A Comparative Handbook. Boston, MA: Walter de Gruyter, 2005. 
Pritchard, E. T. Native New Yorkers: The Legacy of the Algonquin People of New York. Tulsa, OK: Council Oak Books, 2002.
Prindle, T. (1994). 'Nipmuc Splint Basketry.', Nipmuc Indian Association of Connecticut.  Adapted from Native splint basketry: A Key into the Language of Woodsplint Baskets, edited by Russell G. Handsman and Ann McMullen, published in 1987 by the American Archaeological Institute in Washington, CT.
Trumbull, James Hammond. Natick Dictionary. Bureau of American Ethnology Bulletin 25. Washington, D.C.: Government Printing Office, 1903.

Orthographies by language
Latin alphabets
Algic languages
Algonquian languages
Eastern Algonquian languages
Indigenous languages of the North American eastern woodlands
Massachusett language
Languages of the United States
Writing systems of the Americas